The North Junior Football League, also known as the North-East Junior League, was a football league competition operated in northern Scotland (but anchored around the city of Aberdeen) under the Scottish Junior Football Association which operated as the top league in the territory from 1968 until 2001 when a new regional setup was established – although this was very similar to the previous system.

History
In 1968, the Scottish Junior Football Association restructured its leagues into six 'regions', with those local leagues merging in the northern area including the Aberdeen & District League which had been competed for since 1901 and had provided two winners of the Scottish Junior Cup in the 1950s, and the Morayshire Junior League established in 1906. However, outwith the city of Aberdeen (where the only local professional club, Aberdeen F.C. were also based) football in the territory was dominated by the Highland Football League which had member clubs in most of the towns across the Moray Firth and inland. Junior teams that operated in the same towns were invariably run on a smaller scale than their Highland League neighbours, and though technically competing for the same support base and players, had fraternal relationships akin to a farm team model, although formal agreements between them were rare. Even after the 1968 merger, a separate local 'North Section' was established for these landward clubs due to difficulties in travelling regularly to the Aberdeen area where most of the other teams were based. As a consequence of these dynamics, the North League was seen as the weakest of the six regions despite having a larger population than the Fife and Ayrshire regions, and none of its members reached the Scottish Junior Cup final during its 33-year existence.

In 2001 (one year earlier than other parts of the country) a new SJFA North Region was set up, now one of three across Scotland, but with its scope almost unchanged owing to the geography of the area - the existing East and North (re-named West) sections fed the Super League for its first two seasons before a region-wide three-tier model was adopted in 2003. With three stronger district leagues merging to create the East Region and two combining in the West Region, this change further reduced the North's comparative strength, hampered yet more by the defection of four clubs to the Highland League in the 2000s, prompted by some Highland clubs joining the senior Scottish Football League (in turn, the North Juniors also drew new members from amateur football such as the Aberdeenshire AFA). In its first 20 years of operation, the North Region also never produced a Scottish Junior Cup finalist, although its league champions have entered the 'senior' Scottish Cup since 2007 with some credible results.

Champions

Notes

List of winners

Notes

References

Non-League Scotland (archive version), with club progression by season 1990 to 2007)
 Scottish Junior FA Structure, Scottish Junior Football Association

1968 establishments in Scotland
2001 disestablishments in Scotland
Sports leagues established in 1968
Sports leagues disestablished in 2001
Defunct Scottish Junior Football Association leagues
Football in Aberdeen
Football in Aberdeenshire
Football in Moray
Football in Highland (council area)
Scottish Junior Football Association, North Region